Seth Gyaniram Bansidhar Podar College also referred to as Podar College is a private college in the town Nawalgarh of Jhunjhunu district in the Indian state Rajasthan. Its offering education in arts, science and commerce streams at undergraduate and postgraduate levels.

History
Run by the Anandilal Podar Trust, Seth Gyaniram Bansidhar Podar College, Nawalgarh is an educational institution in the Shekhawati region. The college has grown from a Brahmcharyashram established in 1921. Before the formation of University of Rajasthan, the college had been affiliated to Agra University. Mahatma Gandhi as the first Chairman Trustee of the college. The Trust came into being as the result of a benevolent donation by Shri Anandilalji Podar for the uplift of education in the region.

Faculties  
 Faculty of Arts
 Faculty of Commerce
 Faculty of Science
 PIMS (Podar Institute of Management Studies)

External links
 Official website of Seth Gyaniram Bansidhar Podar College

References

Colleges in Rajasthan
Education in Jhunjhunu district
University of Rajasthan
Educational institutions established in 1921
1921 establishments in British India
British colonial architecture in India